Kirsi Marjatta Kunnas (14 December 1924 – 8 November 2021) was a Finnish poet, children's literature author and translator into Finnish. Her oeuvre consists of poems, fairy tale books, drama, translations (e.g. Lewis Carroll, Federico García Lorca) and non-fiction. Her books have been translated into Swedish, English, German, French, Hungarian, Estonian and Polish. She received several awards in Finland for her life's work.

Personal life
Kunnas married author Jaakko Syrjä in 1957. Their sons are singer/songwriter Martti Syrjä and guitarist Mikko Syrjä of Eppu Normaali.

Her parents were visual artists Väinö and Sylvi Kunnas. Her father died when she was four. Her mother married art critic Einari Vehmas.

Kunnas died in her sleep at her home in Ylöjärvi on 8 November 2021, at the age of 96. Her widower Jaakko Syrjä died six months later on 22 May 2022, also at the age of 96.

Bibliography

Poetry
Villiomenapuu (1947)
Uivat saaret (1950)
Tuuli nousee (1953)
Vaeltanut (1956)
Valikoima runoja (1958)
Kuun kuva meissä (1980)
Kaunis hallayö (1984)
Valoa kaikki kätketty (1986)
Puut kantavat valoa, poems 1947–1986 and translated work (1999)

Children's poetry, nursery rhymes
Tiitiäisen satupuu (1956)
Puupuu ja käpypoika (1972)
Hassut aakkoset (1975)
Hanhiemon iloinen lipas (1978), the Finnish translation of Mother Goose
Kani Koipeliinin kuperkeikat (1979)
Sirkusjuttuja (1985)
Tiitiäisen pippurimylly (1991)
Tiitiäisen tuluskukkaro (2000)
Tiitiäisen runolelu (2002)
Tapahtui Tiitiäisen maassa (selection from books Tiitiäisen satupuu, Tiitiäisen tarinoita, Puupuu ja Käpypoika, Sirkusjuttuja, Kani Koipeliinin kuperkeikat, Tiitiäisen pippurimylly, Tiitiäisen tuluskukkaro, Puut kantavat valoa, Tiitiäisen runolelu) (2004)

Fairy tale books, primers
Tiitiäisen tarinoita (1957)
Aikamme aapinen / by Kirsi Kunnas and workgroup (1968)
Aikamme lukukirja: 2–5 / by Kirsi Kunnas and workgroup (1969–1972)

Picture books
Kuin kissat ja koirat (1967)
Kutut kotona (1967)
Pikku lemmikit (1967)
Terveisiä Afrikasta (1967)
Hau hau koiranpennut (1968)
Kis kis kissanpennut (1968)
Etelän eläimiä – Tiedätkö että. 1–6. Together with Kyllikki Röman (1969)
Lintuystävämme – Tietoa linnuista. 1–6. Together with Kyllikki Röman (1969)
Pohjolan eläimiä – Tarua ja totta. 1–6. Together with Kyllikki Röman (1969)

Notable translations into Finnish
The Tall Book of Mother Goose (Hanhiemon iloinen lipas, 1954)
Peter Christen Asbjørnsen: Skrinet med det rare i (Merkillinen lipas, 1955)
Tove Jansson: Vem ska trösta knyttet? (Kuka lohduttaisi Nyytiä? 1960)
Astrid Lindgren: Skrållan och sjörövarna (Saariston lapset merirosvoina, 1968)
Lewis Carroll: Alice’s Adventures in Wonderland (Liisan seikkailut ihmemaassa, 1972, with Eeva-Liisa Manner)
Maurice Sendak: In the Night Kitchen (Mikko maitomies, 1972)
Lewis Carroll: Through the Looking-Glass (Liisan seikkailut peilimaailmassa, 1974, with Eeva-Liisa Manner)
Federico García Lorca: Romancero gitano (Mustalaisromansseja, 1976)

References

External links

 
 The Pan And The Potatoes – A poem of Kunnas with an English translation by Herbert Lomas

1924 births
2021 deaths
Writers from Helsinki
Finnish children's writers
20th-century Finnish poets
Finnish translators
Translators to Finnish
Finnish dramatists and playwrights
Finnish-language writers
Finnish women children's writers
Finnish women poets
Finnish women dramatists and playwrights
21st-century Finnish poets
20th-century Finnish women writers
21st-century Finnish women writers